Sticta is a genus of lichens in the family Peltigeraceae. The genus has a widespread distribution, especially in tropical areas, and includes about 114 species. These lichens have a leafy appearance, and are colored brown or black. Sticta species with cyanobacteria as photobionts can fix nitrogen from the atmosphere, and due to their relative abundance and high turnover, they contribute appreciably to the rainforest ecosystem. They are commonly called spotted felt lichens.

Description
The vegetative bodies of the Sticta, the thalli, are foliose, or leafy in appearance. The lobes are rounded, and the upper surface is black or brown, while the lower surface has a light to dark brown layer of fine hairs (a ), with a few craters, called . Thalli often smell of shrimp or fish. The vegetative reproductive structures called isidia or soredia are often present on species in this genus; apothecia (cup-shaped spore-bearing structures) are rarely found. Sticta species are usually found growing on bark, wood, or mossy rock.

Distribution and habitat
Sticta species are primarily tropical in distribution, but some species have been reported from as north as Norway, and as far south as the southern tip of South America.

Most species of Sticta grow on bark, wood, or mossy rock, usually in humid areas.

Phylogenetics
Phylogenetic analysis of small and large ribosomal RNA subunits has confirmed that the genus Sticta is monophyletic.

Indicators of ecological continuity
Some epiphytic lichen species may be used as "ancient woodland indicators"; they can used to quantitatively assess the degree to which a forest has had a long history of canopy continuity. The presence of these species is a reliable indicator that the forest has existed back to early medieval times, without being clear-cut and regrown.  Two Sticta species, namely, S. dufournii or the blue-green algal morphotype S. canariensis, are among several species of lichens that may be used to calculate the New Index of Ecological Continuity (NIEC), considered the most sensitive and accurate determination of forest continuity.

Bioactive compounds
A comprehensive comparative study on the antioxidant activity of lichens from Hawaii and Iceland revealed the Hawaiian lichen S. weigelii to be a potent producer of antioxidative compounds.

Species

Sticta acyphellata  – Hawaii
Sticta alpinotropica  – Papua New Guinea
Sticta antoniana  – Hawaii
Sticta aongstroemii  – Brazil
Sticta arachnofuliginosa  – Colombia
Sticta arbuscula  – Colombia
Sticta arbusculotomentosa 
Sticta atlantica  – Europe
Sticta atroandensis  – Colombia
Sticta baileyi  – Australia
Sticta borinquensis  – Puerto Rico
Sticta brevior  – Colombia
Sticta brevipes 
Sticta caliginosa 
Sticta camarae 
Sticta canariensis 
Sticta caperata 
Sticta carolinensis 
Sticta ciliata  – Neotropics; Africa; Macaronesia; Western Europe
Sticta corymbosa  – Puerto Rico
Sticta cyphellulata 
Sticta dendroides 
Sticta densiphyllidiata  – Puerto Rico
Sticta deyana  – North America
Sticta diversa 
Sticta duplolimbata 
Sticta emmanueliana  – Hawaii
Sticta filix 
Sticta flavireagens 
Sticta flavocyphellata  – Australia
Sticta flynnii  – Hawaii
Sticta fragilinata 
Sticta fuliginoides  – Continental Europe; Canary Islands; eastern North America; Colombia
Sticta fuliginosa  – widespread
Sticta fuscotomentosa 
Sticta gallowayana 
Sticta globulifuliginosa 
Sticta guilartensis  – Puerto Rico
Sticta harrisii  – Puerto Rico
Sticta hawaiiensis  – Hawaii
Sticta hirsutifuliginosa 
Sticta howei  – Australia
Sticta humboldtii 
Sticta hypopsiloides 
Sticta indica  – India
Sticta isidiokunthii  – Colombia
Sticta jaguirreana 
Sticta laciniosa 
Sticta latifrons 
Sticta leucoblephara 
Sticta limbata 
Sticta lobarioides 
Sticta lumbschiana  – Colombia
Sticta macrocyphellata  – Colombia
Sticta macrofuliginosa 
Sticta macrothallina 
Sticta maculofuliginosa  – Colombia
Sticta marginifera 
Sticta martinii  – New Zealand
Sticta mexicana 
Sticta microcyphellata  – Colombia
Sticta minutula 
Sticta myrioloba  – Australia
Sticta nashii 
Sticta neopulmonarioides 
Sticta papillata  – Colombia
Sticta parahumboldtii  – Colombia
Sticta parvilobata  – Puerto Rico
Sticta pedunculata 
Sticta phyllidiifuliginosa 
Sticta phyllidiokunthii 
Sticta plumbeociliata 
Sticta pseudohumboldtii  – Colombia
Sticta pseudolobaria 
Sticta pulmonarioides 
Sticta riparia  – Puerto Rico
Sticta rhizinata  – Colombia
Sticta rubropruinosa  – Colombia
Sticta rutilans 
Sticta sayeri 
Sticta silverstonei  – Colombia
Sticta sinuosa 
Sticta smithii  – Hawaii
Sticta stipitata 
Sticta subfilicinella 
Sticta sublimbata 
Sticta subtomentella 
Sticta swartzii 
Sticta sylvatica  – continental Europe; Andes (Colombia)
Sticta tainorum  – Puerto Rico
Sticta tatamana 
Sticta tesselata 
Sticta torii 
Sticta tunjensis  – Colombia
Sticta variabilis 
Sticta venosa 
Sticta viviana  – Colombia
Sticta waikamoi  – Hawaii
Sticta xanthotropa

References

Cited literature

 
Peltigerales genera
Lichen genera
Taxa described in 1791
Taxa named by Johann Christian Daniel von Schreber